Peripatus basilensis is a species of velvet worm in the Peripatidae family. This species has 26 to 31 pairs of legs. The type locality is in Haiti.

References

Onychophorans of tropical America
Onychophoran species
Animals described in 1935